Marghdari-ye Debagh (also Romanized as Marghdārī-ye Debāgh) is a village in Shamsabad Rural District, in the Central District of Dezful County, Khuzestan Province, Iran. At the 2006 census, its population was 271, in 54 families.

References 

Populated places in Dezful County